Binaca Geetmala was a weekly countdown show of top filmi songs from Hindi cinema. It was popular and had millions of listeners. Binaca Geetmala was broadcast on Radio Ceylon from 1952 to 1988 and then shifted to the Vividh Bharati Service of All India Radio network in 1989 where it ran until 1994. It was the first radio countdown show of Indian film songs, and has been quoted as being the most popular radio program in India during its run. Its name reflects its sponsorship by Binaca. 
Binaca Geetmala, and its subsequent incarnations named after Cibaca—Cibaca Sangeetmala, Cibaca Geetmala, and Colgate Cibaca Sangeetmala—ran from 1954 to 1994 on Radio Ceylon and then on Vividh Bharati. They also broadcast annual year-end lists from 1954 to 1993.

Annual List by Year
1977

Most No of songs by singer

Ameen Sayani and Radio Ceylon
The show was hosted throughout its entire run by Ameen Sayani. It was very popular in India, with estimated listenership ranging from 900,000 to 2,000,000.  It greatly increased the popularity of Radio Ceylon, making it the primary source of popular film music on radio for the Indian subcontinent.  After 1998, the show aired on Vividh Bharati and was on for half an hour on Monday nights.

Popularity ratings method
At its onset in 1952, the program did not rank songs, but rather played seven contemporary songs in no particular order. Later, the program started ranking the most popular Hindi film songs. 
The songs were initially ranked by a combination of the number of records sold in India and listener votes. Each week, the  would send the radio station their list of popular songs. The clubs were formed because it was possible for a record to be sold out at stores and although there was interest to buy more, the interest would not show up in record sales.

The year-end lists were compiled based on points earned by songs through the year. Between 1966 and 1970 there would sometimes be no points on the weekly broadcast, but the year-end show would be based on point system.

Lists of top songs per year

Silver jubilee and LP record
On 12 December 1977, Binaca Geetmala celebrated its 25-year anniversary in a social gathering organized in Bombay. Many well known composers, poets, and singers attended the show.

The top songs from 1953 to 1977 were compiled and released in a two record volume set. Volume 1 has songs from 1953 to 1964; volume 2 has songs from 1965 to 1977. Between the songs on the volume set, there is commentary by Ameen Sayani.

See also
Ameen Sayani
Bollywood songs
Radio Ceylon

References
8 Binaca Geetmala 1964 Songs List

Music chart shows
Indian radio programmes
All India Radio